Joseph Robert Weldon (18 June 1922 – 10 August 2007) was an Australian rules footballer who played with Footscray in the Victorian Football League (VFL).

His football career was interrupted by his service in World War II.

Notes

External links 

1922 births
Australian rules footballers from Melbourne
Western Bulldogs players
2007 deaths
Royal Australian Air Force personnel of World War II
Royal Australian Air Force airmen
People from Yarraville, Victoria
Military personnel from Melbourne